The Greifenseelauf is an annual road running event in the Swiss Canton of Zurich, that was established in 1980 and takes place in the middle of September.

From 1980 to 1985 the course ran over a distance of 19 km, from 1986 to 1991 over 19.5 km. Ever since 1992 the distance of the course has been that of a half marathon|21.0975 km). The current course runs counter-clockwise around the Greifensee. The start and finish points are in Uster. Both the half marathon and 10 km run are officially measured. Apart from these two distances there are a variety of short distances - especially for children.

In 2009 the half marathon had 8985 finishers (6360 men and 2625 women), 1193 more than the year before. That same year, the 10 km race was completed by 1737 people (750 men and 987 women).

Statistics

Past winners

17.9 km

Half marathon

19.5 km

19 km 

† The 1980 women's course distance was seven kilometres.

References

List of winners
Datasport official results 2014.  Retrieved on 2014-09-22.
Das Goldene Buch. Greifenseelauf. Retrieved on 2011-11-26.
''Greifenseelauf. Association of Road Racing Statisticians. Retrieved on 2011-11-26.

External links
 Official website



Half marathons
10K runs
Long-distance running competitions
Recurring sporting events established in 1980
Athletics competitions in Switzerland
Uster
Road running competitions
Annual sporting events in Switzerland
1980 establishments in Switzerland
Autumn events in Switzerland